Rhithrogena is a genus of flatheaded mayflies in the family Heptageniidae. There are at least 150 described species in Rhithrogena.

See also
 List of Rhithrogena species

References

Further reading

External links

 

Mayfly genera